Rahel Friederich (born 22 January 1986) is a Swiss orienteering competitor. She was born in Zürich. She competed at the World Orienteering Championships in 2011 and 2012; in 2012 she placed fifth in the individual sprint competition. She won a gold medal in the mixed sprint relay with the Swiss team at the 2014 World Orienteering Championships.

References

External links

1986 births
Living people
Sportspeople from Zürich
Swiss orienteers
Female orienteers
Foot orienteers
World Orienteering Championships medalists
Competitors at the 2009 World Games